Medininagar block is one of the administrative Gram panchayat of Palamu district, Jharkhand state, India.

References
Blocks of Palamu district

Community development blocks in Palamu district